EOP may refer to:

 Earth orientation parameters
 Electroosmotic pump
 Emergency operations plan (US)
 European Opera-directing Prize
 Exchange Online Protection, part of Microsoft's Exchange Online family
 Executive Office of the President of the United States
 External occipital protuberance
 Hellenic Cycling Federation , the governing body of cycle racing in Greece
 Early Oil Project, the development of the Chirag oilfield
 Enhanced opportunity partner, NATO Enhanced Partnership Opportunities interoperability program
 Escalation of Privilege, a cybersecurity threat
 Endrogenous opioid peptides

See also
 Ethernet over PDH, a set of protocols for carrying Ethernet traffic